Ranee Lee, CM (born October 26, 1942 in Brooklyn, New York City) is an American jazz singer and musician who resides in Montreal, Quebec. She is also an actor, author, educator and television host. Referred as “Montreal's Queen of Jazz,” Lee is a Juno Award winner, two-time Top Canadian Female Jazz Vocalist by Jazz Report Magazine and was honored with the International Association of Jazz Educators Awards for her outstanding contribution to jazz music.

Biography
Born in Brooklyn, Lee moved to Montreal at the age of 28 in 1970. She toured North America in the 1970s as a jazz drummer and tenor saxophonist. She subsequently landed a starring role playing Billie Holiday in Lady Day, and won a Dora Mavor Moore Award for her performance. She subsequently began recording as a vocalist, releasing her first album Live at the Bijou in 1984.

She wrote and starred in Dark Divas, The Musical, a tribute to the lives and careers of seven of the most popular female jazz singers of the 20th century: Josephine Baker, Billie Holiday, Pearl Bailey, Lena Horne, Dinah Washington, Ella Fitzgerald, and Sarah Vaughan.

Her music appears in the animated short film Black Soul (2002).

She is also a children's book writer (author of Nana, What Do You Say?); an educator, long associated with the University of Laval in Quebec City and the Schulich School of Music of McGill University; and she hosted the television series The Performers.

Honors and awards

Martin Luther King Jr. Achievement Award in 1988 for her musical and actorial achievements. Lee was named a member of the Order of Canada in 2006. She received the International Association of Jazz Educators award in 2004 and 2008. She won a 2010 Juno Award for her album Ranee Lee – Lives Upstairs.

Discography
 All Grown Up (RCA Victor, 1980)
 Live at the Bijou (Justin Time, 1984)
 Deep Song: a tribute to Billie Holiday with Oliver Jones (Justin Time, 1989)
 The Musicals: Jazz on Broadway (Justin Time, 1992)
 I Thought About You (Justin Time, 1994)
 You Must Believe in Swing (Justin Time, 1996)
 Seasons of Love (Justin Time, 1997)
 Presents Dark Divas (Justin Time, 2000)
 Maple Groove: Songs from the Great Canadian Songbook (Justin Time, 2003)
 Just You, Just Me with Oliver Jones (Justin Time, 2005)
 Lives Upstairs (Justin Time, 2009)
 A Celebration in Time with Oliver Jones, (Justin Time, 2010)
 What's Going On (Justin Time, 2014)

References

External links
Jim Santella, review of "Ranee Lee & Oliver Jones: Just You, Just Me (2005)". All About Jazz, November 9, 2005.
Justin Time (label): Ranee Lee.
Ranee Lee at Wild West Artist Management.
Ricardo McRae, "Ranee Lee", Who's Who in Black Canada, March 15, 2011.

1942 births
Living people
Actresses from Montreal
American expatriate musicians in Canada
Anglophone Quebec people
Canadian musical theatre actresses
Dora Mavor Moore Award winners
Canadian women jazz singers
Juno Award for Vocal Jazz Album of the Year winners
Members of the Order of Canada
Musicians from Brooklyn
Singers from Montreal
20th-century Black Canadian women singers
21st-century Black Canadian women singers